Buck is an unincorporated community in Summers County, West Virginia, United States, located southeast of Hinton.

The community most likely was named after the deer buck.

References

Unincorporated communities in Summers County, West Virginia
Unincorporated communities in West Virginia